The 2nd Grenadier Division was an infantry unit in the Imperial Russian Army as part of the Grenadier Corps. Its headquarters was located at Moscow. Notable engagements of the division include the French invasion of Russia.

Organization

1812 
 1st Brigade
 Kiev Grenadier Regiment
 Moscow Grenadier Regiment
 2nd Brigade
 Astrakhan Grenadier Regiment
 Fanagoria Grenadier Regiment
 3rd Brigade
 Siberian Grenadier Regiment
 The Little Russian Grenadier Regiment
 2nd Artillery Brigade

1914 
 1st Grenadier Brigade (Moscow)
 The 5th Grenadier General of Kiev, Field Marshal Prince Nikolay Repnin, now EVI V. Heir of the Tsesarevich Regiment
 6th Grenadier General-Field Marshal of the Grand Duke Mikhail Nikolayevich regiment
 2nd Grenadier Brigade (Moscow)
 The 7th Grenadier of the Samogit General-Adjutant Count Totleben regiment
 8th Grenadier Moscow Grand Duke of Mecklenburg-Schwerin Frederick Regiment
 2nd Grenadier Artillery Brigade ( Pavlovskaya Sloboda )

Division Command

Chiefs of the division 
 1812 - Major-General Prince of Mecklenburg-Schwerin, Karl August Christian
 1813 - Major-General Pisarev, Alexander Alexandrovich
 01.1814 - 1817 - Lieutenant-General Ivan Paskevich
 14.11.1817 - September 8, 1823 - Lieutenant-General Shakhovskoy, Ivan Leontievich
 06.01.1826 - Major-General (since 22.08.1826 Lieutenant-General) Poluektov, Boris Vladimirovich
 until 08.12.1837 - Lieutenant-General Poleshko, Stepan Grigorievich
 12/30/1837 - 12/10/1840 - Lieutenant-General Rozen, Roman Fedorovich
 12.10.1840 - 19.12.1843 - Lieutenant-General Shulgin, Dmitry Ivanovich
 19.12.1843 - until 18.01.1849  - Major-General (then Lieutenant-General) Frederiks, Alexander Andreevich
 01/18/1849 - 1856 - Lieutenant-General Zherkov, Alexander Vasilyevich
 08.09.1856 - 1863 - Lieutenant-General Voelkner, Vladimir Ivanovich
 10.1863 - 01.1864 - Lieutenant-General Bel'gard, Valerian Alexandrovich
 18.03.1864 - 30.08.1869 - Lieutenant-General, Adjutant-General von Patkul, Alexander Vladimirovich
 11/06/1986 - June 14, 1872 - Lieutenant-General Apostol Kostanda
 1876?  - 14.12.1877 - Lieutenant-General Svechin, Vladimir Konstantinovich
 14.12.1877 - 1878 - Lieutenant General Cvetzinsky, Adam Ignatievich
 1880 - 1886 - Lieutenant General Tsege-von-Manteuffel, Nikolai Maksimovich
 19.10.1886 - 07/21/1984 - Lieutenant-General Pavel Grigorievich Dukmasov
 08/02/1984 - May 31, 1889 - Lieutenant-General Kvitsinsky, Iosif Ignaty Onufrievich
 09.07.1898 - 07.01.1906 - Lieutenant-General Buturlin, Sergey Sergeevich
 09.01.1906 - June 27, 1906 - Major-General Stolitsa, Evgeny Mikhailovich
 04.07.1906 - 29.12.1908 - Lieutenant-General Ignatiev, Lev Ivanovich
 29.12.1908 - 26.04.1911 - Lieutenant-General Arkady Nikanorovich Nishenkov
 05/01/1911 - 09/12/1915 - Lieutenant-General Stavrovich, Nikolai Grigorievich
 09.12.1915 - 23.06.1917 - Major-General Sklyarevsky, Vasily Epifanovich
 06/23/1917-?  - Major-General Dovgird, Stefan Antonovich

Heads of division headquarters 
 14.04.1868 - 12.04.1872 - Colonel von der Launitz, Mikhail Vasilyevich
 12.02.1876 - 09.05.1881 - Colonel Golovin, Mikhail Ivanovich
 хх.хх.1881 - хх.хх.1885 - Colonel Verigin, Evgeny Alexandrovich
 05/28/1885 - 02/07/1982 - Colonel Volkov, Vladimir Sergeevich
 10.05.1892 - 27.10.1893 - Colonel Polyakov, Vladimir Alekseevich
 10/27/1983 - 11/12/1987 - Colonel Petrov, Alexander Konstantinovich
 11/15/1977 - 02/02/1901 - Colonel Kyprian Kandratovich
 25.02.1901 - 12.08.1902 - Colonel Malinka, Vladimir Ivanovich
 08/22/1902 - June 1, 1904 - Colonel Russian, Mikhail Alexandrovich
 06/22/1904 - 05/28/1907 - Colonel von Colen, Constantine Konstantinovich
 21.06.1907 - 02.11.1911 - Colonel Staev, Pavel Stepanovich
 02.11.1911 - 31.03.1913 - Colonel Grishinsky, Alexey Samoilovich
 27.04.1913 - 20.12.1914 - Colonel Dreving, Pyotr Fedorovich
 20.12.1914 - 16.09.1915 - Colonel Sukhodolsky, Vyacheslav Vladimirovich
 10/20/1915 - 1917 - Lieutenant Colonel (since 08/08/1916 Colonel) Lukyanov, Grigory Lukich

The commanders of the 1st Brigade 
 until 26.08.1812 - Colonel Shatilov, Ivan Yakovlevich
 after 26.08.1812 - Major Kononenko, Andrei Nikiforovich
 10/01/1814 - 01/31/1817 - Major-General Nikolai Sulima
 08/15/1832 - 02/04/1833 - Major-General Alexander von Moller
 up.  1840 - April 17, 1844 - Major-General Skobeltsyn, Nikolai Nikolaevich
 17.04.1844 - 20.02.1846  - Major-General Smitten, Alexander Evstafievich
 03.03.1846 - 11.05.1854 - Major-General Friedrichs, Alexander Karlovich
 1873 - 12.04.1878 - Major-General Tsege-von-Manteuffel, Nikolai Maksimovich
 24.05.1878 - 26.03.1882 - Major-General Plaksin, Vadim Vasilyevich
 03/26/1882 - August 28, 1886 - Major-General Molsky, Vitaly Konstantinovich
 09/22/1886 - February 20, 1889 - Major-General Tugengold, Alexander Vasilyevich
 02/20/1889 - May 27, 1811. - Major General Aleksandr Fyodorovich Rittikh
 07/02/1981 - 02/14/1984 - Major-General Bibikov, Mikhail Ilyich
 16.02.1894 - 18.11.1895 - Major-General Lyapunov, Alexander Yakovlevich
 11/30/1989 - 13.09.1899 - Major-General Mikhail Zasulich
 31.10.1899 - December 28, 1904 - Major-General Stolitsa, Evgeny Mikhailovich
 14.01.1905 - 27.03.1907 - Major-General Khodnev, Ivan Dmitrievich
 28.03.1907 - 31.12.1913 - Major-General Mikhno, Sergey Dmitrievich
 12/31/1913 - 03/05/1914 - Major-General Chaplygin, Alexander Ivanovich
 08.06.1914 - 29.07.1914 - Major-General Saychuk, Afanasy Semenovich

The commanders of the 2nd Brigade 
 until 26.08.1812 - Colonel Buksgewden, Ivan Filippovich
 after 26.08.1812 - Major Mikhail Zasulich
 09/11/1816-?  - Major-General Krishtafovich, Yegor Konstantinovich
 01.1825-03.1831 - Major-General Emma, Alexander Fedorovich
 1850-1855 - Major-General Ivashintsev, Sergey Nikolaevich
 27.05.1882-31.12.1892 - Major-General Lipinsky, Vasily Iosifovich
 18.01.1893-10.02.1902 - Major-General Smirnsky, Konstantin Ivanovich
 10.03.1902-28.04.1906 - Major-General Nikonov, Semyon Ivanovich
 05.05.1906-09.11.1907 - Major-General Kaigorodov, Mikhail Nikiforovich
 28.11.1907-30.01.1915 - Major-General Malinka, Vladimir Ivanovich
 03.02.1915-07.04.1917 - Major-General Lesnevsky, Iosif Vikentevich
 05.05.1917-08.10.1917 - Major-General Oleksander Osetsky

Commanders of the 3rd Brigade 
 1812 - Colonel Levin, Dmitry Andreevich
 Gartung, Nikolai Ivanovich
 24.08.1824-02.08.1825 - Major-General Shulgin, Dmitry Ivanovich
 Major-General Skobelev, Ivan Nikitich

The commanders of the 2nd Grenadier Artillery Brigade 
 1881 - Major-General Mikhel, Yegor Yegorovich
 02/27/1981 - 10/19/1982 - Major-General Sokolov, Leonid Alexandrovich
 19.10.1892 - 29.10.1899 - Major-General Platonov, Leonid Nikolayevich
 29.12.1899 - 27.02.1900 - Colonel (since 1.01.1900 Major-General with confirmation in his post) Ivanovsky
 29.03.1900 - 27.09.1902 - Major-General Chersky, Vladimir Yakovlevich
 10/03/1902 - 17.05.1906 - Major-General Glazenap, Georgy Alexandrovich
 05/20/1906 - 12.09.1907 - Major-General Slyusarenko, Vladimir Alekseevich
 12.09.1907 - 29.11.1908 - Major-General Tarkhov, Alexey Nikolaevich
 17.12.1908 - 05.07.1910 - Major-General Petunin, Alexander Yakovlevich
 07/25/1910 - 05/31/1912 - Major-General Semyonov, Alexander Ivanovich
 05/31/1912 - 25.03.1944 - Major-General Davydov, Dmitry Alekseevich
 09.04.1914 - 1915 - Major-General Kopestynsky, Ivan Grigorievich
 15.01.1915 - 1917 - Major-General Sozanovich, Vladimir Fedorovich

Literature 
 Patriotic War of 1812.  Encyclopedia.  Ed.  VM Bezotosnogo .- Moscow: ROSSPEN, 2004.- 878 p.
 Tolstoy LN War and Peace // Collected Works: 22 volumes.  - M .: Fiction, 1979.

Links 
 2nd Grenadier Division beats Shevardinsky redoubt.  Painter IV Evstigneev.  1956
 The site of Runivers.  Chronicles of the Patriotic War of 1813.  Russian Army.  2nd Western Army.  8th Infantry Corps.

Infantry divisions of the Russian Empire
Moscow Governorate